Matthew Leitch (born 19 March 1975) is an English actor, known for his portrayal of Floyd Talbert in the award-winning HBO miniseries Band of Brothers. He also starred in the 2006 action film The Detonator.

Biography
Leitch started his acting career in the television series Renford Rejects on Nickelodeon and then in Miami 7. His breakthrough role was on Band of Brothers as Floyd Talbert. He then went on to star in the British film AKA opposite his Band of Brothers co-star Peter Youngblood Hills.

Leitch has also had minor roles in the films Below and The Dark Knight.

He has appeared in TV adverts for The Times and Warburtons.

In August 2021, Leitch launched Renford Rejects: The Podcast which he co-hosts alongside Tom Weller who played Terry Stoker on the show. The podcast sees Leitch and Weller catching up with the show's cast and crew, as well as reminiscing about the show.

Filmography

Film

Television

References

External links
 

1975 births
20th-century English male actors
21st-century English male actors
English male film actors
English male television actors
Living people
Male actors from London